Clarissimyia is a genus of flies in the family Stratiomyidae.

Distribution
Brazil.

Species
Clarissimyia pallipes (Lindner, 1964)

References

Stratiomyidae
Brachycera genera
Diptera of South America
Endemic fauna of Brazil